The Association of Investment Companies (AIC) is the United Kingdom trade association for the closed-ended investment company industry.

Function
The association represents a broad range of closed-ended investment companies, incorporating investment trusts, offshore investment companies, REITs and Venture Capital Trusts (VCTs) that are traded on the London Stock Exchange, AIM, Specialist Fund Segment and Euronext.

History
It was founded in 1932, and was owned by James Henry. It was previously called the Association of Investment Trust Companies.

Location
AIC is situated in the City of London near to Moorgate tube station.

References

External links
Official website

Investment trusts of the United Kingdom
Trade associations based in the United Kingdom
Organisations based in the London Borough of Islington
Organizations established in 1932